This is a list of Archaeological Protected Monuments in Vavuniya District, Sri Lanka.

Notes

References

External links